The Producers Guild of America Visionary Award is awarded annually by the Producers Guild of America (PGA) at the Producers Guild of America Awards ceremonies to recognize television, film, or new media producers for their unique or uplifting contributions to our culture through inspiring storytelling or performance. The award category was instituted in 2001 and first awarded at the 13th Annual Producer Guild of America Awards, in March 2002.

Award winners

References

Visionary Award